Al-Midaina Sport Club is an Iraqi football team based in Al-Midaina, Basra, that plays in Iraq Division Three.

Managerial history

  Hameed Eqab
  Tariq Fartous 
  Khalil Kadhim Falhi

See also 
 2000–01 Iraqi Elite League
 2021–22 Iraq FA Cup

References

External links
 Al-Midaina SC on Goalzz.com
 Iraq Clubs- Foundation Dates

Football clubs in Iraq
2000 establishments in Iraq
Association football clubs established in 2000
Football clubs in Basra
Basra